Death Valley Gunfighter is a 1949 American Western film directed by R. G. Springsteen and written by Robert Creighton Williams. The film stars Allan Lane, Eddy Waller, James Nolan, Gail Davis, William "Bill" Henry, Harry Harvey, Sr. and Mauritz Hugo. The film was released on  March 29, 1949, by Republic Pictures.

Plot

Cast    
Allan Lane as Rocky Lane 
Black Jack as Rocky's Horse
Eddy Waller as Nugget Clark
James Nolan as Shad 
Gail Davis as Trudy Clark
William "Bill" Henry as Sheriff Keith Ames 
Harry Harvey, Sr. as Banker Vinson McKnight
Mauritz Hugo as Henchman Tony Richards
George Chesebro as Wagon Driver Sam
Forrest Taylor as Lester Clark
George Lloyd as George
Lane Bradford as Snake Richards

References

External links 
 

1949 films
American Western (genre) films
1949 Western (genre) films
Republic Pictures films
Films directed by R. G. Springsteen
American black-and-white films
1940s English-language films
1940s American films